This is a list of movie theater chains across the world. The chains of movie theaters are listed alphabetically by continent and then by country.

Global cinema chains 
The following are the world's largest movie theatre chains:

Africa

Ghana
 Silverbird Cinemas – in 2 locations in Accra, Ghana

Morocco 
 Megarama – operating in Casablanca, Marrakesh and Fez, with more cities coming.
 IMAX – inside Morocco Mall, Casablanca
 La Renaissance – independent cinema in Rabat; includes a restaurant and a music venue.
 CINEATLAS - a premium cinema with 4 screens in Rabat, offering films both 3D and 2D formats.

Tanzania
 Century Cinemax - The only cinema operator in Dar-Es-Salaam with movie houses at Mlimani City Mall, Aura Mall and Dar Free Market Mall. Century Cinemax is the largest cinema operator in East Africa with presence in Tanzania, Uganda, Kenya and South Africa. By 2022 the total screens will reach 50 under management.

Uganda
 Century Cinemax - Largest cinema operator in Kampala with movie houses at Acacia Mall, Metroplex Shopping Center and Arena Mall.

Kenya

 Century Cinemax is the largest cinema operator in East Africa. As of 2021 has screens at the Sarit Centre in Westlands, Junction Mall and Garden City Mall which also has the largest IMAX screen in East Africa.

Nigeria
 Silverbird Cinemas – As at 2022, the largest cinema chain in West Africa in-terms of screen numbers, operating with 65 screens. It has 10 theatres in three countries; Ghana, Liberia, Nigeria.
 Filmhouse Cinemas (West Africa) – with 13 cinemas as of 2022, it is the largest cinema chain in West Africa in terms of location numbers. It has 65 screens in locations such as Lagos, Ibadan, Lekki where they have the first IMAX theatre in West Africa, Calabar, Akure, Port Harcourt, Kano and Asaba. The company was established in 2012 and it is aiming to have 25 cinemas.
 Genesis Deluxe cinemas – with over 15 screens and 7 theatres, located in Lagos, Lekki, Port-Harcourt, Enugu, Effurun and Owerri. It was the first cinema in West Africa to show a 3D movie.
 Viva Cinemas – with 18 screens and 5 theatres in Ilorin, Ibadan, Ota, Enugu, Ikeja. The company started operations in 2015.
 Ozone Cinemas – with 4 screens located in Lagos. It is the first multiplex cinema to be built on the mainland of Lagos.

South Africa
 Ster-Kinekor – operating throughout South Africa, it has the largest market share with 53 locations 
 Nu Metro Cinemas – 17 locations in South Africa
 CineCentre

Tunisia
 Pathé Cinema – luxurious and highly equipped cinema multiplexes, in two locations in Sousse (widest screen in Africa), Tunis

Sudan
 Bono Cinema – as of May 13, 2022, this is the first Sudanese cinema operator of its kind in the Republic of Sudan, and the first greatly-designed international cinema in the whole country with a capacity of over 300+ seats, located in the capital Khartoum, Nile Street, at the International Nile Club, currently running with 1 screen.

Americas

Argentina
In 2021,the country had 303 cinemas. 
Cinemark Hoyts
Cinépolis
Showcase Cinemas

Bolivia
Multicine
Cine Center
Cinemark

Brazil
Brazil has more than 3500 cinemas.
Afa Cinemas
Araújo
Arteplex
Arcoplex 
Box
Centerplex
Cine Show
Cineart
Cinearte
Cinemagic
Cinemais
Cinemaniaca
Cinemark Theatres
Cineplex
Cineplus
Cinépolis
Cinesystem
Cinespaço (Espaço)
Estação
GNC Cinemas
Grupo Arcoíris
Grupo Cine
Guion
Lumiere
Moviecom
Multi Star
Orient
PlayArte
PMC
Roxy Cinemas
Sala de Arte
UCI Cinemas
Usiminas
Cine A
Cineflix
Cinesercla
M.M.C. Cinemas
Multicine
AGA Cinematográfica
Kinoplex

Canada
Alliance Cinemas – after selling its BC locations, it now operates only one theater in Toronto
Ciné Entreprise – independent theatre chain based in rural Québec
Cinémas Guzzo – 10 locations and 142 screens in the Montreal area
Cineplex Entertainment – Canada's largest and North America's fifth-largest movie theater company, with 162 locations and 1,635 screens
 Cinema City – discount chain in Western Canada, purchased by Cineplex
Cineplex Odeon Cinemas – operations in both Canada and the United States. Operations in each country is owned by separate companies. Cineplex Entertainment in Canada and AMC Theatres in the United States.
Colossus (theatre) – a Famous Players brand, now owned by Cineplex
Famous Players – formerly Canada's largest theatre chain; purchased by Cineplex Entertainment in 2005
Fortune Cinemas – a movie theatre chain that operated in Canada. Cineplex has sold seven theatres in March 2006 in Québec ec to Chelsea-based Fortune Cinemas Inc. Cineplex Entertainment later acquired (or in this case, re-acquired) some of Fortune Cinemas theatres after they went bankrupt. 
Galaxy Cinemas – mid-sized chain that was the parent company to Cineplex Entertainment.  Galaxy purchased bankrupt Cineplex in 2003.
Scotiabank Theatres – a Cineplex brand
SilverCity – a Famous Players brand, now owned by Cineplex
CinéStarz – small chain that operates 5 theaters: 3 in Quebec and 2 in Ontario
film.ca Cinemas – a small Canadian operator with one location in Oakville, ON
Imagine Cinemas – 14 locations and 90 screens, in Ontario and BC.
Landmark Cinemas – Canada's second-largest chain with 45 locations and 317 screens in British Columbia, Alberta, Saskatchewan, Manitoba, Ontario and the Yukon
Premier Theatres – operates 5 drive-in theaters and 4 cinemas with a total of 23 screens in Ontario and Yellowknife NWT
Rainbow and Magic Lantern Cinemas – 11 locations and 43 screens operating in Ontario, Alberta and Saskatchewan

Defunct brands in Canada
AMC Theatres –  AMC divested of its Canadian operations, selling four to Cineplex, two to Empire Theatres which were later sold to Landmark Cinemas in 2013, closing two.
Empire Theatres – closed on October 29, 2013, by selling most of their locations to Cineplex Entertainment and Landmark Cinemas and closing 3 others that were not included in the sales. It was formerly Canada's second-largest chain.
Stinson Theatres

Chile
Cinépolis Chile
Cinemark
Cineplanet
Cine Arte Normandie
Centro Arte Alameda
Cine Star
Cine Pavilion
El Biógrafo

Colombia
Cine Colombia
Cineland
Cinemark
Cinépolis
Procinal
Royal Films

Costa Rica
 CCM Cinemas
 Cinemark
 Cinépolis
 Citicinemas
 Multicinemas
 Nova Cinemas

Dominican Republic
 Caribbean Cinemas
 Palacio del Cine

Ecuador
Cinemark
Cinex
Max Cinema
Multicines
Supercines

El Salvador
Cinemark
Cinépolis
Multicinema

Guatemala
AlbaCinema 
CineFlick! 
Cinemark
Cinépolis

México
 Cinépolis
 Cinemex
 Cinetop
 The Movie Company
 Gocinema
 Henry Cinemas
 CitiCinemas
 Cinemagic
 Cinebox

Defunct brands in Mexico
MMcinemas (bought by Cinemex)
Cinemas Lumiere
Cinemark (bought by Cinemex)
Cinemas Gemelos and Multicinemas – part of the brand Organización Ramírez and were the largest cinema chains in the country
AMC Theatres – existed a short time since the early 90s in Plaza Satellite, Galerias Coapa, Perisur, Pericentro (naucalpan), and Pabellon Cuauhtemoc.
General Cinema – had two theaters in Pavellon Polanco and Plaza Insurgentes
 Carlos Amador Martínez – named "tele-cine or also "Tele Cines Casa"" closed in the period 1995–1996, most theaters were located in the city of Mexico City and Monterrey

Panama
Cinemark
Cinépolis
Caribbean Cinemas

Paraguay
Cines Itaú – 4 theaters
Cines del Mall
Villamorra Cinecenter
Real Cines
Cine Art
Cine Granados
Cinemark

Peru
Cinemark
Cineplanet
Cine Star
UVK Multicines
Movie Time Cinemas
Cinépolis

Puerto Rico
 Caribbean Cinemas – 35 theaters, located in Puerto Rico and across the Caribbean, including Panama and Guyana

Suriname
TBL Cinemas

Trinidad and Tobago
MovieTowne
Caribbean Cinemas
Digicel IMAX/CinemaOne

United States

Uruguay
Life Cinemas
Movie
GrupoCine
Cinemateca Uruguaya

Venezuela
Cines Unidos
Cinex
Movie Planet
Plató Cines
Super Cines

Asia

Nepal
Kirtipur Cineplex
Ranjana Cineplex
Big Movies
FCube Cinemas
QFX Cinemas
MidTown Cinemas

Afghanistan
Ariana Cinema
Aryob Cinema
Bakhtar Cinema
Biraristan Cinema
Khairkhona Cinema
Kunduz Cinema
Pamir Cinema
Park Cinema
Temurshahi Cinema

Saudi Arabia
VOX Cinemas
AMC Theatres
Muvi Cinemas
Empire Cinemas 
Cinepolis Cinemas
Grand Cinemas
Reel Cinemas

Bangladesh
Star Cineplex

Brunei
The Mall Cineplex
Times Cineplex

China
In 2014 there were 5,813 movie theaters in China and 299 cinema chains, with 252 classified as "rural" and 47 as "urban".
Antaeus Cinema Line
APEX Cinemas
Beijing New Film Association
Broadway Cinemas
China Film Group Digital Cinema Line
China Film South Cinema Circuit
China Film Stellar
Cinemark
CJ CGV
Dadi Theater Circuit
Hengdian Cinema Line
Jinyi Cinema Line
Lumiere Pavilions – a cinema chain with 30 cinemas operating across 30 major Chinese cities, known for its keen interest in importing Hollywood films
Sichuan Pacific
Shanghai Film (former partner of Warner Bros.)
Shanghai United Circuit
UA Cinemas
UME Cinemas – one of China's longest-running cinema groups, operating 400 screens in 25 cinemas across the country 
Wanda Cinemas
YES Dream Cinema - an independent cinema in the Liwan District, Guangzhou
Zhejiang Time Cinema

Hong Kong

Broadway Circuit
AMC Cinemas
PALACE
Premiere Elements
MOViE MOViE
MY CINEMA
Chinachem Cinema Circuit
Orange Sky Golden Harvest
MCL Cinemas
Grand
Star Cinema
Movie Town
Newport Circuit
UA Cinemas

India

Gold Cinema - Multiplex chain with a presence in Assam, Gujarat, Haryana, Himachal Pradesh, Madhya Pradesh, Maharashtra, Meghalaya, Rajasthan & Uttar Pradesh
Cine Square Cinemas –  multiplex chain with presence in Ahmedabad, Kaithal, Doraha, Sikar, Godhra, Burhanpur, Delhi, Chalisgaon, Proddatur and Ratangarh
City Pride - Multiplex Chain based out of Pune
SDC Cinemas - Chennai, Coimbatore, Madurai, Tamil Nadu Chittoor, Andhra Pradesh
K Sera Sera Miniplex – K Sera Sera Limited multiplex chain with presence in Abohar, Hoshiarpur, Nawanshahr, Sangrur, Ramnagar, Ahmedabad, Mahad, Mumbai, Nagpur, Goa, and Durg
SRS Cinemas – multiplex chain with presence in Faridabad, Gurgaon, Patiala, Ludhiana, Ranchi, Ghaziabad, Shimla, Bijnor, etc.
MARIS – now LA Cinemas in Tiruchirappalli;Tamilnadu was India's first multiplex built in 1970.
Q Cinemas – multiplex chain with presence in Kochi, Faridabad, Bangalore, Delhi, Ludhiana
PVS Film City – Multiplex chain based in Kerala with presence in five locations.
MovieTime Cinemas – 35 screens in West and North India
Asian Cinemas – Multiplex Chain with properties in Warangal, Hyderabad, Nizambad, Siddipet, Khammam, Metpally, Karimnagar and Mancherial.
Nest Cinemas – pan-India digital cinema chain based out of Mumbai with properties in Mumbai, Ahmedabad, Pune
Cine Grand – pan-India multiplex chain with properties in Mumbai, Ahmedabad, Gurgaon.
Cinemarc Theatres – multiplex chain in Vadodara
City Gold Cinemas – multiplex chain in Ahmedabad, Gujarat
Wide Angle Cinemas – multiplex chain in Ahmedabad and Mehsana
Wow Cine Pulse – multiplex chain in Ahmedabad, Mehsana, Halol, Kalol, Bareja, Khedbhramha and more in Gujarat.
Time Cinemas – multiplex chain in Ahmedabad, Surat, Vadodara, Idar, Patan and more in Gujarat.
Ariesplex SL Cinemas – multiplex group based in Trivandrum.
Pan Cinemas – Multiplex chain based in Kochi & Alappuzha
Gmax Cinemas – Multiplex chain based in Kollam,Thodupuzha
Pyramid Saimira Theatres Ltd – cinema chain in Chennai and Tamil Nadu
Zeon Cinemas - Multiplex chain based in Gobichettipalayam and Tiruppur in Tamilnadu
M2K Cinemas – Operator with multiplexes in New Delhi
AGS cinemas – Multiplex chain with 4 properties and 18 screens in Chennai
Rajhans Cinemas in Nadiad, Valsad, Ahmedabad, Baroda, Surat, Navsari, Mumbai, Pune and more in Gujarat
V Celluloids(V Mega Talkies) in Andhra Pradesh, V-Epic Sullurupeta, Kurnool, Adoni, Guntur, Chittoor, Chilakaluripet, Narasaraopet, Ongole, Tenali, Repalle, Singarayakonda, Venkatagiri, Kavali, Anantapur, Bapatla, Srikalahasti.
Capital Cinemas in Vijayawada, Andhra Pradesh, India powered by Prasads Multiplex and Suresh Productions
Mukta A2 Cinemas in Mumbai, Hyderabad, Ahmedabad, Dehradun, Kundli, Banswara, Gulbarga, Vizag, Vadodara, Sailu, Aurangabad
EOS Cinemas – has many multiplexes in Madhya Pradesh like in Shahdol and Satna and in Chhattisgarh
SVF Cinemas – East Indian multiplex chain with 17 properties and 32 screens in Kolkata, Purulia, Bolpur, Tejpur (Assam), Kanchrapara, Coochbehar, Durgapur, Buxar, Serampore, Kalna, Baranagore, Maldah, Chinsurah, Naihati, Barrackpore, Uttarpara Krishnanagar etc.
Movietime - operates in cinemas in Jammu

Indonesia
21 Cineplex – largest cinema chain in Indonesia, owns around 64% of cinemas in Indonesia
CGV Cinemas – chain owned by CJ CGV, owns around 17% of cinemas in Indonesia
Cinépolis (previously as Cinemaxx) – chain owned by Lippo Group and Mexican movie theater Cinépolis, owns around 15% of cinemas in Indonesia (all Cinemaxx theaters were rebranded as Cinépolis since November 20th, 2019)
Platinum Cineplex – chain in Central Java, Bitung, Palopo, Ambon, South Sumatera
New Star Cineplex – chain in Banten, West Java, Central Java, East Java, and South Borneo
Movimax – 2 locations in Malang and 1 location in Surabaya, East Java
FLIX Cinema – 3 locations in Jakarta and 1 location in Bekasi
Kota Cinema - 2 locations in Bekasi, 1 location in Jember, 1 location in Madura, 1 location in Gresik, and 1 location in Banjarmasin
Dakota Cinema - 2 locations in Cilacap, 1 location in Sengkang, 1 location in Bandung
There are some independent stand alone cinemas such as: Rajawali Cineplex in Purwokerto, Mopic Cinema in Lumajang, IGN Cinema in Poso, Planet Cinema in Bone, Hollywood Square Cinema in Kendari, E-Plaza Cinema in Semarang, Surya Yudha Cinema in Banjarnegara, Gajah Mada Cinema in Tegal, Denpasar Cineplex in Bali, BES Cinema in Bangka, LTD9 Cinema in Pangkalpinang. Moviplex in Sukabumi

Iran
Asr Jadid
Crystal
Farhang
Shahrghashang
Sahra
Shaghayegh
Sahel
Africa
G2
Ferdosi
Javaan
Sorush
Shahrtamasha
Astara
Sepideh
Piruzi
Anahita
Nahid
Tazh
Arash
Asemanaabi
Shirin
Islamic

Israel
Cinema City
HOT CINEMA (Formerly Globus Max)
Rav-Hen
Yes Planet
Lev
Movieland

Japan
109 Cinemas
AEON Cinema (formerly Warner Mycal Cinemas)
T-Joy Cinema
Toho Cinemas
United Cinemas

Kuwait
 Cinescape | Kuwait National Cinema Company
 Sky cinema
 Grand cinema
 Ozone cinema
 Vox Cinema

Malaysia

Golden Screen Cinemas
TGV Cinemas
MBO Cinemas
Lotus Five Star
mmCineplexes
Paragon Cinemas
Superstar Cinemas
Blockbuster Cineplexes
Suara Screens
My Cinema
Mega Cineplex
Iswaria Cineplex

Pakistan
 The Arena
 Atrium Cinemas
 Bambino Cinema
 Cine Gold
 Cinegold Plex
 Cinepax
 Cine One
 CineStar
 DHA Cinema
 Nueplex Cinemas
 PAF Cinema
 Sozo World
 Super Cinema
 Taj Mahal Multiplex
 Universal Cinemas – Pakistan's largest multiplex
 Universe Cineplex
CUE Cinemas
Nagina Cinemas

Philippines
SM Cinemas
Ayala Malls Cinemas
Robinsons Movieworld
Megaworld Cinemas
Starmall Cinemas
Vista Cinemas
 Gaisano Cinemas

Singapore

Cathay (also in Malaysia)
Golden Village – a joint venture between Australia's Village Roadshow and Hong Kong's Golden Harvest in Singapore
Shaw Organization
WE Cinemas
Sinema Old School
Filmgarde

South Korea
CJ CGV – largest multiplex cinema chain of Korea, with 1,201 screens worldwide and more than 100 million viewers worldwide
Cine de Chef – cinema and restaurant operated by CJ CGV
Megabox multi – cultural multiplex cinema chain
Lotte Cinema – chain run by the Lotte Group operating both stand alone theaters and theaters inside Lotte Department Store branches

Taiwan
Ambassador Theaters – 13 theaters
Cinemas of Central Motion Picture Co. – 4 theaters
Cinemark – 2 theaters
Miramar Cinemas (with IMAX theater) – 3 theaters
Shin Kong Cinemas – 3 theaters
Showtime
 Showtime Cinemas – 8 theaters
 Showtime Union – 7 theaters
 Spot – 2 theaters
Vieshow (with IMAX theater) (formerly Warner Village) – 18 theaters
in89 Cinemax – 6 theaters
Wovie Cinemas – 2 theaters

Thailand

Major Cineplex – largest cinema group in Thailand. The group includes (by brands):
Major Cineplex
EGV Cinemas
Paragon Cineplex
Esplanade Cineplex
Quartier Cineart
Icon Cineconic
Cineplex (M Collection brands)
SF Group
SF World Cinema
SFX Cinema
SF Cinema
Emprive Cineclub
Major Hollywood
Century The Movie Plaza

Turkey
Atlantis
Avsar
Cinemaximum
Cinecity
Cinema Pink
Cinemarine
Cineplex
Cinetech
Prestige 18
Majestik Film 5
Vizyon
Sinemay Sinemalari
Cinens 3

United Arab Emirates
VOX Cinemas
Novo Cinemas
Reel Cinemas
Oscar Cinemas
Star Cinemas
Cine Royal Cinemas – Abu Dhabi
Roxy Cinemas – Dubai
Cinemacity Cinemas – Arabian Center, Dubai
La Playa Lounge – Out Door Cinema

Vietnam
CGV Cinemas (formerly Megastar Cineplex)
Galaxy Cinemas
BHD Star Cineplex
Lotte Cinema
CINEMAX
PLATINUM Cineplex
Beta Cineplex
Starlight
Cinestar
MegaGS
Cinebox
Ramestar
Goldstar

Europe

France
Les Cinémas Gaumont Pathé 
CGR
UGC
Kinepolis
Mégarama
MK2
Cinéville
Grand Écran
Utopia

Germany
CineStar
UCI
Cineplex
CinemaxX
K-Motion
Kinopolis
Capitol
Ufa
Yorck
Kinostar
Drive-In
Apollo
Rex
Filmpalast

Italy
Cecchi Gori Group
Cineplexx Cinemas
The Space Cinema (Vue)
UCI Cinemas

Poland
Cinema City
Helios
Multikino

Russia
Cinema Park
Formula Kino
Karo Film
KinoMax
Premierzal
Luxor
Cinema Star
Monitor
Mirage Cinema
KinoFormat
United Cinema Chain
Illuzion

Spain
Cinesa (Odeon Cinemas Group - An AMC Company)
Yelmo Cines (Cinépolis)
Kinépolis
Mégarama
Cines Golem
Cines Plaza
Sade Cine
Cines Victoria
Cines Colci
Odéon Multicines
Al-Ándalus
Balaña
Cineápolis
Cines ABC
Cines Artesiete
Cines Filmax
Cines IMF
Cines Renoir
Cines Verdi
Cinesur
La Dehesa
Neocine
Ocine

Switzerland
Apollo
Arthouse
Kitag Cinemas
Pathé
Rex

United Kingdom

See Also Cinema of the United Kingdom

Cineworld
Curzon
Empire Cinemas (includes some locations divested as a condition of merger between Odeon and UCI/AMC)
Everyman Cinemas
Hollywood Cinemas (a small regional chain based in Norfolk)
Merlin Cinemas
Movie House Cinemas (Northern Ireland)
National Amusements
Odeon (AMC) 
Parkway Cinemas – family owned independent chain with 4 cinemas
Picturedrome Cinemas
Picturehouse Cinemas (Cineworld)
Reel Cinemas
S & B Cinemas – operates a small number of cinemas in Somerset, UK
Showcase 
Silver Screen Cinemas (Independent Cinema chain in Folkestone and Dover, Kent)
The Light Cinemas
Vue

Rest of Europe

Apollo Kino - cinema chain in Estonia
Castello Lopes – cinema chain in Portugal
Cinamon – cinema chain in Estonia, Finland, Latvia and Lithuania
Cinema City - cinema chain owned by Cineworld in Czech Republic, Hungary, Poland, Romania, Slovakia, Bulgaria
Cinemas NOS – cinema chain in Portugal
Cinemax - cinema chain in Slovakia and Romania
CinemaxX - cinema chain owned by Vue Cinema in Germany and Denmark
Cineplexx - cinema chain in Austria, Albania, Croatia, Greece, Italy, Kosovo, North Macedonia, Montenegro, Romania, Serbia, Slovenia
CineStar - cinema chain in Germany, Bosnia and Herzegovina, Czech Republic, Croatia, Italy and Swtizerland
Cityplex - cinema chain in Romania
Filmstaden - cinema chain owned by Odeon Cinemas Group (AMC Theatres) in Sweden
Finnkino – cinema chain owned by Odeon Cinemas Group (AMC Theatres) in Finland
Forum Cinemas - cinema chain in Estonia, Latvia and Lithuania 
Happy Cinema - cinema chain in Romania
Kinepolis – cinema chain in Belgium, France, Luxembourg, Netherlands, Poland, Spain, Switzerland
Kino Arena - cinema chain in Bulgaria
Movies @ Cinemas - cinema chain in Ireland
Multikino - cinema chain owned by Vue Cinema in Poland, Latvia, Lithuania and Estonia
Multiplex - cinema chain in Ukraine
Nordisk - cinema chain in Denmark, Norway and Sweden
Odeon Cinemas - cinema chain owned by Odeon Cinemas Group (AMC Theatres) in Ireland, Norway and United Kingdom
Odessa Kino - cinema chain in Ukraine
Omniplex – cinema chain in the Republic of Ireland and Northern Ireland
Pathé - cinema chain in Belgium, France, Netherlands, Switzerland,  Tunisia and Senegal
UCI Cinemas - cinema chain owned by Odeon Cinemas Group (AMC Theatres) in Germany, Italy and Portugal
UGC - cinema chain in France and Belgium
Village - cinema chain in Greece

Former chains
ABC
Apollo – cinema chain in the United Kingdom
Cannon
Essoldo
Granada Plc
MGM
Palas Cinemas - merged with Cinema City
Sandrews – cinema chain in Sweden
Silver Screen (Poland) – merged with Multikino
Virgin
Utopolis - cinema chain in Belgium, Netherlands, Luxembourg and France
Ward Anderson - cinema chain in Ireland

Oceania

Australia

Cineplex Australia
Dendy Cinemas
Event Cinemas (previously known as Greater Union, Birch, Carroll & Coyle and Village Cinemas)
Howard Cinemas
Hoyts
Independent Exhibitors
Palace Cinemas and Luna Palace Cinemas
The Movie Masters – Ace Cinemas and Grand Cinemas
Reading Cinemas
United Cinemas
Victa Cinemas
Wallis

New Zealand

Ascot Cinema
Berkeley Cinemas
Bridgeway Cinema
Capitol Cinema
Cinema 3 Pukekohe
Confluence Whanganui
Embassy 3 Whanganui
Event Cinemas
Hoyts
Lido Cinema
Light House Cinema
Monterey Cinemas
SKYCITY Cinemas
Reading Cinemas
Rialto Cinemas
State Cinemas
The Vic Devonport

See also
List of movie theaters
Film screening
Home cinema
Movie palace
Movie theater
Independent movie theater
Multiplex

References

External links

 

 
Lists of cinemas